Bittersweet and Blue, the second album by British singer-songwriter Gwyneth Herbert, was released in 2004 on the Universal Classics and Jazz label. It comprised mainly jazz standards. Herbert's version of Neil Young's "Only Love Can Break Your Heart", taken from the album, was featured on the soundtrack of romantic comedy Leap Year, directed by Anand Tucker and starring Amy Adams and Matthew Goode. The album received a four-starred review in The Guardian.

Reception
Linda Serck, reviewing Bittersweet and Blue for musicOMH, described it as "a stunning album" from a "great jazz talent" who "embodies all the smoky jazz boozers she's ever sung in and tacitly commands you to prick up your ears and listen".

John Fordham, in a four-starred review for The Guardian, praised Herbert's "precociously powerful chemistry of taste and meticulous care for every sound – from a whisper to an exhortation."

Track listing

Personnel
 Gwyneth Herbert – vocals
 John Parricelli – acoustic, electric, nylon string and steel string guitars (except on "Bittersweet and Blue")
 Will Rutter  – acoustic guitar on "Bittersweet and Blue"
 Tom Cawley – piano, vibes, Fender Rhodes and Hammond Organ
 Mark Hodgson – double bass
 Jeremy Stacey – drums (except on "Fever" and "Almost Like Being In Love")
 Ian Thomas – drums on "Fever" and "Almost Like Being In Love"
 Paul Clarvis – percussion
 Steve Sidwell – trumpet
 Neil Sidwell – trombone
 Nigel Hitchcock – tenor saxophone on "It's Alright With Me" and "A Little Less"
 Dave Bishop – tenor saxophone (except on "It's Alright With Me" and "A Little Less")

Production
The album was produced and engineered by Pete Smith and was recorded and mixed at Townhouse Studios in west London between June and July 2004.

Design
The album sleeve, incorporating photographs by Uri Weber, was designed by Rummey Design.

Dedication

The album is dedicated to the memory of Tristan Hewins.

References

External links
 Gwyneth Herbert: official website

2004 albums
Gwyneth Herbert albums
Jazz albums by British artists